Oliver Thomal Minatel (born 29 August 1992), known as Oliver, is a Brazilian former professional footballer, who currently serves as the Head of Recruitment and Player Development for Canadian Premier League club Cavalry FC.

Career

Youth
After spending five years at his home club Guarani, Mintatel joined the esteemed academy of Paulínia in 2007 where he would play three seasons in the Campeonato Paulista and featured in the Copa São Paulo.

At Nacional, Minatel spent one year with their U-19 squad where he finished second on the team in scoring with 18 goals from 22 matches. Minatel made the move to Nacional after spending a year with the U-19 side of Dutch side PSV Eindhoven. PSV discovered Minatel while scouting players in the Copa São Paulo, the biggest U-19 National Tournament in the world.

Nacional
Minatel spent three seasons with Portuguese side C.D. Nacional that included two years in the Primeira Liga. Minatel became the youngest player in Nacional club history to start in an international match when he featured in their UEFA Europa League qualifier against Icelandic side Fimleikafélag Hafnarfjarðar at 18 years of age.

Velo Clube
Minatel moved back to his native Brazil to Velo Clube, where he spent the majority of 2013, before signing with NASL club Ottawa Fury on November 14, 2013.

Ottawa Fury
Oliver would go on to be the club's leading scorer in 2014, scoring 7 goals in 22 league appearances. On 19 January 2015, he was re-signed by Ottawa for an additional year.

In April 2015, Oliver made international news after being attacked by a fellow passenger while on an Air Canada flight from Toronto to Atlanta with his team for an away match against the Atlanta Silverbacks. He was uninjured and the perpetrator was taken into the custody of the FBI and local law enforcement in Atlanta. The unprovoked attacker had attempted to choke Oliver with a headphone cord from the seat behind, but was separated from him by Minatel's teammates and other passengers.

Oliver finished the 2015 season with 3 goals in 25 appearances in all competitions. In December 2015, he was officially released by the club.

Puerto Rico FC
On March 10, 2016, Oliver was signed by NASL expansion team Puerto Rico FC.

South Melbourne
On February 13, 2018, Oliver joined the South Melbourne FC for the 2018 season. Throughout the later stages of the season, Oliver was utilised in a defensive midfield role in which he excelled despite playing out of position. He was pivotal in South Melbourne's survival against relegation.

Cavalry FC
Oliver returned to Canada in 2019, joining Cavalry FC ahead of the inaugural Canadian Premier League season. Oliver was Cavalry FC's first-ever non-Canadian signing. He cited the quality of life in Canada as a factor in his decision to return. He scored 8 goals in his first season with Cavalry as the team came very close to winning the championship. In December 2019, Cavalry announced Minatel would return to the club for the 2020 season. Unfortunately, he fractured both his tibia and his fibula in a match against York9, ending his season. He returned for the 2021 season, but was sidelined for most of the season due to his injury, only managing to appear in 3 matches at the end of the year. He departed the club following the 2021 season.

York United 
Minatel remained signed with York United FC ahead of the 2022 Canadian Premier League season.

After a number of injuries that limited his time with both Cavalry and York United, on October 11, 2022, Minatel announced his retirement from the professional game.

After retirement 
Shortly after putting an end to his playing career, on February 8, 2023, Minatel was officially announced as the new Head of Recruitment and Player Development by his former club Cavalry FC.

Career statistics
.

Honours

Club
Calvary FC
 Canadian Premier League Finals
Runners-up: 2019
Canadian Premier League (Regular season): 
Champions: Spring 2019, Fall 2019

References

External links

1992 births
Living people
Association football forwards
Brazilian footballers
Sportspeople from Campinas
Brazilian expatriate footballers
Expatriate footballers in the Netherlands
Brazilian expatriate sportspeople in the Netherlands
Expatriate footballers in Portugal
Brazilian expatriate sportspeople in Portugal
Expatriate soccer players in Canada
Brazilian expatriate sportspeople in Canada
Expatriate footballers in Puerto Rico
Expatriate soccer players in the United States
Brazilian expatriate sportspeople in the United States
Expatriate soccer players in Australia
Brazilian expatriate sportspeople in Australia
C.D. Nacional players
Associação Esportiva Velo Clube Rioclarense players
Ottawa Fury FC players
Puerto Rico FC players
Richmond Kickers players
South Melbourne FC players
Cavalry FC players
York United FC players
Primeira Liga players
North American Soccer League players
USL Championship players
Victorian Premier League players
Canadian Premier League players
Première ligue de soccer du Québec players